The Hills District Bulls is a Parramatta District junior rugby league football club which play in  at Crestwood Oval. They have played in the Parramatta District since 1964. They field teams in all age groups including C-Grade, A-Grade, Sydney Shield and Ron Massey Cup competitions.

History
Over a few beers at the Bull & Bush Hotel at Baulkham Hills the club's name and legend was born in 1963.  The club's inaugural season was 1964. They commenced with an A Grade, A Reserve Grade and C Grade team and trained on Yattenden Oval. On some match days when there were insufficient A Grade players available, players from the A Reserve Grade team would double up and play two games. They moved from Yattenden Oval to The Castle Hill Showground in about 1966 although some home games were played at the Showground in 1964. From there they moved to Jasper Road to train and play their home games. The C Grade side won the Premiership in 1965 their second year in the competition and the first Premiership for the Club. They have used Crestwood Oval, Baulkham Hills, as their home ground since it was created in the 1970s.
On 4 September 2022, Hills District won the Ron Massey Cup after defeating Glebe 18-12 in the grand final.

Hills District are currently a senior feeder side to NSW Cup team The North Sydney Bears.

Notable Juniors
Notable First Grade Players that have played at Hills District Bulls include:
John Kolc (1972–81 Parramatta Eels)
Wade L'Estrange (2000 Parramatta Eels)
Daniel Irvine (2000–07 Parramatta Eels, Canterbury & South Sydney Rabbitohs)
Nathan McMillan (2003 Parramatta Eels)
Heath L'Estrange (2004–13 Manly-Warringah Sea Eagles, Sydney & Bradford)
John Williams (2005–10 Parramatta Eels, Sydney, Cronulla & North Queensland)
Blake Green (2007– Parramatta Eels, Cronulla, Canterbury, Hull KR & Wigan)
David Williams (2008–15 Manly-Warringah Sea Eagles)
Jarred Farlow (2013 Wests Tigers)
Jason Baitieri (2010– Sydney Roosters & Catalans Dragons)
Jamie Buhrer (2010– Manly-Warringah Sea Eagles, Newcastle Knights)
Luke Keary (2013– South Sydney Rabbitohs, Sydney Roosters)
Ava Seumanufagai (2013– West Tigers, Cronulla-Sutherland Sharks, Leeds)
Pauli Pauli (2014– Parramatta Eels, Newcastle Knights, Wakefield Trinity)
Feleti Mateo (2004, 2006–2010 Parramatta Eels, 2011–2014 New Zealand Warriors, (2015–2016) Manly-Warringah Sea Eagles)
Joshua Curran (2019 Sydney Roosters, New Zealand Warriors)
Ryan Papenhuyzen (2019– Melbourne Storm)

Patrons
The club patrons are John Kolc and Ron Hilditch, both of whom have had distinguished rugby league careers, playing first grade for Parramatta Eels and later representing NSW and Australia.

Life members
The following persons have been awarded the honour of life membership of the club in recognition of many years of volunteer service to the club:
Barry Clapham, John Billings, Bob Collings, Phil O'Brien, Mick Shanahan, Allan Cook, Barry L'Estrange, Michael Gremmo, Bob Rose, Jenny Byrne, Brian Witt, Dennis Foulstone, Barry Rudd, Allan Weeks, John Noble, John Young, Brian Horder, Kevin Shanahan, Keith Churchland, Barbra Abbott, Steven Sullivan, Marj Radford (d), Warren Heath (d), Stan Concroft (d), Keith Hoyle (d), Keith Woellner (d).

Playing Record in NSWRL Competitions

Ron Massey Cup

Sydney Shield

Metropolitan Cup

See also

List of rugby league clubs in Australia
Rugby league in New South Wales

References

External links

Rugby league teams in Sydney
Rugby clubs established in 1964
1964 establishments in Australia
The Hills Shire